Adinandra forbesii is a species of plant in the Pentaphylacaceae family. It is endemic to New Guinea island, within the nation of Papua New Guinea, and in the Western New Guinea region of Indonesia. It is an IUCN Red List near-threatened species, endangered by habitat loss.

References

forbesii
Endemic flora of New Guinea
Flora of Papua New Guinea
Flora of Western New Guinea
Trees of New Guinea
Near threatened flora of Asia
Taxonomy articles created by Polbot